Kings Forest is a small settlement located on the far north coast of New South Wales, Australia, in the Tweed Shire.

Demographics 
Due to the small population for this area, In the 2016 Census, there were 35 people in Kings Forest. Of these, 48.6% were male and 51.4% were female. The median age was 44 years and the average number of people per household was 2.6.

References 

Suburbs of Tweed Heads, New South Wales
Towns in New South Wales